Rodman McCamley Price (May 5, 1816June 7, 1894) was an American naval officer, businessman, and Democratic Party politician who served as the 17th Governor of New Jersey from 1854 to 1857. He also worked to establish the American government in California and served on the first San Francisco City Council, where he became a real estate tycoon. He represented New Jersey in the United States House of Representatives for one term from 1851 to 1853.

Early life and career
Rodman McCamley Price was born in Frankford Township, New Jersey on May 5, 1816. His grandfather and great-uncle were quartermasters for the Continental Army and later merchants.

He attended the public schools of New York City and the Lawrenceville Academy. Price pursued classical studies at The College of New Jersey (today Princeton University) but did not graduate due to illness. He read law but never practiced, choosing instead to enter the commission business in New York.

Naval career, Mexican-American War, and California
Using family connections to the Martin Van Buren administration, Price secured an appointment as a purser in the United States Navy in 1840. His first assignments came during peacetime, and he sailed aboard the USS Fulton and USS Missouri. In July 1843, Price was aboard the Missouri on its voyage as one of the first steam warships to cross the Atlantic Ocean. 

While off the coast of Gibraltar, the Missouri was wrecked in an accident, and Price spent some time as a guest of the British Consul in Gibraltar before touring the Iberian Peninsula. He met with the famous American author Washington Irving, serving as the United States Minister to Spain, and aided Irving's research on a biography of Christopher Columbus. He also visited Paris before returning to duty. Price rejoined the Navy on the sloop of war USS Cyane, part of John D. Sloat's Pacific Squadron. As purser, Price's duties were primarily to oversee payrolls; he occasionally made land at Monterey, Matamoros, or Lima to provision and bargain with local merchants.

On July 7, 1846, the Cyane entered the Mexican-American War by ferrying a detachment of United States Marines who seized Monterey, California. On the same day, Sloat, now Military Governor of California, named Price prefect and alcalde (magistrate) at Monterey, where he administered the military occupation for a month. As alcalde, Price's duties included recording land titles, and he exploited his position by acting as Sloat's investment agent and partner in the land rush that followed the American annexation.

San Francisco
In 1848, he returned to New York to secure himself an appointment as purser for the Pacific Squadron. He moved to a new headquarters in San Francisco, where he provisioned and payrolled ships between Monterey and Honolulu.

When the California gold rush hit and inflated commodity prices, the Navy expected Price to establish the hegemony of American credit and prevent the drain of gold bullion to London. Instead, he enriched himself as a real-estate tycoon and entered politics. He was elected to the first Common Council of San Francisco and became a booster of the city's Long Wharf project. In August 1849, he was "detached" from the Pacific Squadron for making unauthorized drafts on specie in the Customs House and neglecting to submit quarterly returns on expenses.

Despite his removal, Price's political career flourished. In September 1849, he was a delegate to the first of the California Constitutional Conventions and finished third in the November elections for the new state's inaugural United States Representatives. He served on the first Ayuntamiento de San Francisco from August 6, 1849 to January 10, 1850. He returned to Washington to render account, but on his return journey his steamer, the Orleans St. John, caught fire on the Alabama River. Price claimed his payroll vouchers were destroyed in the fire, muddling his case and leading to years of litigation over $88,000 in unaccounted Navy funds.

In December 28, 1849, he purchased Rancho San Geronimo from fellow naval officer Joseph Warren Revere for $7,500. The two would split the profits of timber exports from the property. On August 6. 1851, Price bought the remainder of Revere's property for $8,000. Price's move to New Jersey later inspired Revere to purchase farm land and construct The Willows, a custom mansion in Morristown, New Jersey.

U.S. House of Representatives (1851–53)
Having left California, Price purchased a mansion in Hoboken and entered a Wall Street partnership to manage his California holdings and speculated in Californian real estate. In 1850, Price's father and Robert Field Stockton, who was familiar with Price from Stockton's time as military governor, engineered Price's nomination for U.S. Representative from the state's fifth congressional district, which was composed of Bergen, Essex, Hudson, and Passaic counties. Owing to a division in the Whig Party following the Compromise of 1850, Price was narrowly elected in the usually Whig district.

Price was not an active member of the House and served one uneventful term in office, largely focusing on his California real estate deals and constituent services. He participated in only one House debate, speaking in favor of recodification of martial law aboard Navy vessels. He argued that traditional flogging led to a "well-ordered, well-disciplined ship," but that summary courts-martial should supersede the captain's power to punish at sea. He lost re-election in 1852 and returned home to focus on his property interests.

Governor of New Jersey (1854–57)

1853 election

In 1853, Price was recruited to run for Governor on the Democratic ticket. Whig critics attacked him for his ties to the "Joint Companies," a name given to the conglomerate formed by the merger of the Delaware and Raritan Canal Company with the Camden & Amboy Railroad, and his residence in California, which some argued disqualified him from office. The Democratic campaign focused on an opposition to monopoly and a general promise of "reform." Price was elected by a reduced but substantial margin.

Term in office
Price was elected by a reduced he became the father of the public school system of New Jersey. He established a ferry from Weehawken to New York and engaged in the quarrying business and in the reclamation of lands along the Hackensack River.

Later career
Price was a delegate to the Peace Conference of 1861 held in Washington, D.C. in an effort to devise means to prevent the impending Civil War.

Death
Price died in Oakland, New Jersey on June 7, 1894. He was buried in the Reformed Cemetery, in Mahwah, New Jersey.

References

Notes

External links

Biography of Rodman M. Price, New Jersey State Library
New Jersey Governor Rodman McCauley Price, National Governors Association
Rodman McCamley Price, The Political Graveyard

Dead Governors of New Jersey bio for Rodman McCamley Price
Guide to the Rodman M. Price Papers at The Bancroft Library

1816 births
1894 deaths
Democratic Party governors of New Jersey
People from Newton, New Jersey
Princeton University alumni
United States Navy officers
Democratic Party members of the United States House of Representatives from New Jersey
American Presbyterians
American people of Welsh descent
Lawrenceville School alumni
Burials in New Jersey
19th-century American politicians
Military personnel from New Jersey